Washington Township may be any of these 22 places in the U.S. state of Pennsylvania:

Washington Township, Armstrong County, Pennsylvania
Washington Township, Berks County, Pennsylvania
Washington Township, Butler County, Pennsylvania
Washington Township, Cambria County, Pennsylvania
Washington Township, Clarion County, Pennsylvania
Washington Township, Dauphin County, Pennsylvania
Washington Township, Erie County, Pennsylvania
Washington Township, Fayette County, Pennsylvania
Washington Township, Franklin County, Pennsylvania
Washington Township, Greene County, Pennsylvania
Washington Township, Indiana County, Pennsylvania
Washington Township, Jefferson County, Pennsylvania
Washington Township, Lawrence County, Pennsylvania
Washington Township, Lehigh County, Pennsylvania
Washington Township, Lycoming County, Pennsylvania
Washington Township, Northampton County, Pennsylvania
Washington Township, Northumberland County, Pennsylvania
Washington Township, Schuylkill County, Pennsylvania
Washington Township, Snyder County, Pennsylvania
Washington Township, Westmoreland County, Pennsylvania
Washington Township, Wyoming County, Pennsylvania
Washington Township, York County, Pennsylvania

See also
 Warrington Township, Bucks County, Pennsylvania
 Warrington Township, York County, Pennsylvania
 Washington, Pennsylvania (disambiguation)

Pennsylvania township disambiguation pages